Michael David Flynn (born July 31, 1953) is an American former professional basketball player. He played as a guard.

Flynn was born in Casablanca, Morocco but grew up in Jeffersonville, Indiana, USA. He attended Jeffersonville High School, where he was Indiana's Mr. Basketball and a Parade All-American in 1971. Flynn then played at the University of Kentucky, where he scored 835 points in three seasons and reached the NCAA Men's Division I Basketball Championship in 1975 before losing to UCLA. During the late 1970s and early 1980s he competed professionally for the Indiana Pacers and in Sweden.

Flynn was inducted into the Indiana Basketball Hall of Fame in 2005.

Flynn also pitched in the Little League World Series in 1965 as a member of the George Rogers Clark All-Stars of Jeffersonville, IN.

Flynn has four children: three sons, and one daughter.  B.J. and Michael Flynn played for the University of Louisville, while Marcus Flynn played for Bellarmine University.

References

External links
College Statistics at BigBlueHistory.net

Indiana Basketball Hall of Fame profile

1953 births
Living people
Alviks BK players
American expatriate basketball people in Sweden
American men's basketball players
Basketball players from Indiana
Indiana Pacers players
Kentucky Wildcats men's basketball players
Parade High School All-Americans (boys' basketball)
People from Jeffersonville, Indiana
Philadelphia 76ers draft picks
Point guards
Sportspeople from Casablanca